Gardiner Glacier is a glacier at the south side of the Quartz Hills of Antarctica, flowing east from the Watson Escarpment into Reedy Glacier. It was mapped by the United States Geological Survey from surveys and U.S. Navy air photos, 1960–64, and was named by the Advisory Committee on Antarctic Names for Richard D. Gardiner, a construction electrician at Byrd Station in 1962.

References

Glaciers of Marie Byrd Land